The Battle of Stilo (also known as Cape Colonna and Crotone) was fought on 13 or 14 July 982 near Crotone in Calabria between the forces of Holy Roman Emperor Otto II and his Italo-Lombard allies and those of the Kalbid emir of Sicily, Abu'l-Qasim. .

Abu'l-Qasim, who had declared a Holy War (jihad) against the Germans, retreated when he noticed the unexpected strength of Otto's troops when he was not far from Rossano Calabro. Informed by some ships of the Muslim retreat, Otto left in that city his wife and children with the baggage and the imperial treasure, and set to pursue the enemy. When Abu'l-Qasim recognized that his flight had no hope of success, he fielded his army for a pitched battle south of Crotone at Cape Colonna. After a violent clash, a corps of German heavy cavalry destroyed the Muslim centre and pushed towards al-Qasim's guards. The emir was killed, but his troops were not shaken by the loss: they even managed to surround the German troops with a hidden cavalry reserve (approx. 5,000 warriors), slaughtering many of them. According to the historian Ibn al-Athir, casualties were around 4,000. Landulf IV of Benevento, Henry I, Bishop of Augsburg, Günther, Margrave of Merseburg, the Abbot of Fulda and 19 other German counts were among them. Otto had to flee the battlefield and swim towards a Greek merchant ship which gave him shelter. Resting in Rossano, he only returned to Rome on 12 November 982.

The defeat forced Otto to flee north, where he held an assembly of primarily north Italian magnates at Verona. He sent his nephew Otto I, Duke of Swabia and Bavaria, back to Germany with the news, but he died en route. News of the battle did reach as far as Wessex, which is significant of the magnitude of the disaster. Bernard I of Saxony was heading south for the assembly when Danish Viking raids forced him to return. Saxon losses at Stilo had been most severe. At the assemblage, Otto secured his son Otto III's election as King of Italy and a call for reinforcements from Germany. He died the next year before continuing his campaign in the south.

The state of the Mezzogiorno was shaken up. Besides Landulf IV, his brothers Pandulf II of Salerno and Atenulf also died in battle. Though the Kalbid troops were forced to retreat afterwards to Sicily, the Saracens remained a presence in southern Italy, harassing the Greeks and Lombards. Capua and Benevento meanwhile passed to younger branches of the Landulfid family and Salerno was snatched by Manso, Duke of Amalfi.

In Germany, the Elbean Slavs, upon hearing news of the emperor's defeat, rose against their German suzerains under Mstivoj in a great revolt known as the Slawenaufstand. The Germanisation and Christianisation of the Slavs was put back for decades.

Notes

Sources

Reuter, Timothy. Germany in the Early Middle Ages 800–1056. New York: Longman, 1991.

Stilo 982
Stilo 982
Stilo 982
Stilo
10th century in Italy